WHWK (98.1 FM "The Hawk") is a commercial radio station in Binghamton, New York.  It carries a country music radio format and is owned by Townsquare Media.  Local disc jockeys are heard during the day on weekdays.  Two syndicated shows are heard after 7 p.m.:  Taste of Country Nights from Compass Media Networks, hosted by Amber Atnip and Evan Paul, and The Blair Garner Show from Westwood One heard overnights.  Current local staff include Glenn Pitcher, Traci Taylor, Jess Dallas and Buddy Logan.  It is regularly the highest ranking station in the Nielson ratings in the Binghamton radio market.

WHWK has an effective radiated power of 6,700 watts.  The transmitter is off Ingraham Hill Road in Binghamton, amid the towers for other FM and TV stations in the region.

History
In January 1956, the station first signed on as WNBF-FM.  It was co-owned with AM 1290 WNBF and Channel 12 WNBF-TV (now WBNG-TV).  The owner was Triangle Publications, which also put out the weekly magazine TV Guide.  At first, WNBF-FM simulcast the programming on the AM station.

In the 1960s, WNBF-FM switched to its own beautiful music format.  It played quarter hour sweeps of mostly instrumental cover versions of popular songs, as well as Broadway and Hollywood show tunes.

In 1972, Stoner Broadcasting, based in Des Moines, bought WNBF-AM-FM.  Also in 1972, WNBF-FM changed its call sign to WQYT, representing its "quiet" format.  In the 1980s, the easy listening music audience was aging while advertisers mostly seek young and middle aged adults.  Management decided to make a change.

In January 1984, 98.1 switched to a country music format, calling itself "98.1 The Hawk."  It switched its call letters to WHWK.  In 1999, Gateway Communications, the publisher of The Record of Bergen County, New Jersey, bought WNBF-TV.  At the same time, Citadel Broadcasting acquired WHWK and its AM counterpart, WNBF.

References

External links
Official website
98.1 The Hawk Official Facebook Page
98.1 The Hawk Official Twitter

Country radio stations in the United States
HWK
Townsquare Media radio stations
Radio stations established in 1956
1956 establishments in New York (state)